Endtyme is the sixth full-length album by British doom metal band Cathedral. Released in 2001, this album is a return to the more dark and gloomy sound found on their first album.

The cover art was created by Sunn O))) guitarist Stephen O'Malley. It was the first Cathedral album not to feature cover art by Dave Patchett.

Track listing 
"Cathedral Flames" – 1:59
"Melancholy Emperor" – 5:32
"Requiem for the Sun" – 6:54
"Whores to Oblivion" – 6:32
"Alchemist of Sorrows" – 7:16
"Ultra Earth" – 9:22
"Astral Queen" – 6:39
"Sea Serpent" – 5:48
"Templar's Arise! (The Return)" – 13:39
"Gargoylian" – 7:47 (Japanese edition bonus track)

2001 albums
Cathedral (band) albums
Albums produced by Billy Anderson (producer)
Earache Records albums